One Hour Married is a 1927 American silent short comedy film starring Mabel Normand and directed by Jerome Strong.  The film is notable for being Mabel Normand's last appearance onscreen prior to her death in 1930.

Plot 
The story is set during the First World War and involves a newly married wife's attempts to locate her husband (drafted into the army just an hour after they were married) in France.

Cast 
 Mabel Normand
 Creighton Hale
 James Finlayson
 Noah Young
 Syd Crossley
 Charles Geldert

References

External links 

1927 films
1927 comedy films
Silent American comedy films
American silent short films
American black-and-white films
1927 short films
American comedy short films
1920s American films